Idiopoma doliaris is a species of large freshwater snail with a gill and an operculum, an aquatic gastropod mollusk in the family Viviparidae.

Distribution 
This species is found in Myanmar and in Thailand.

Description
The width of the shell is 26 mm. The height of the shell is 35 mm.

References

Viviparidae